Mark Knowles and Daniel Nestor were the defending champions, but Knowles chose not to participate, and only Nestor competed that year.
Nestor partnered with Nenad Zimonjić, and won in the final 6–4, 7–6(7–3), against Marcelo Melo and André Sá.

Seeds
All seeds receive a bye into the second round.

Draw

Finals

Top half

Bottom half

External links
 Draw

Doubles